This is a breakdown of the results of the 2017 German federal election. The following tables display detailed results in each of the sixteen states and all 299 single-member constituencies.

Electoral system
Germany uses the mixed-member proportional representation system, a system of proportional representation combined with elements of first-past-the-post voting. The Bundestag has 598 nominal members, elected for a four-year term; these seats are distributed between the sixteen German states in proportion to the states' population eligible to vote.

Every elector has two votes: a constituency and a list vote. 299 members are elected in single-member constituencies by first-past-the-post, based just on the first votes. The second votes are used to produce an overall proportional result in the states and then in the Bundestag. Seats are allocated using the Sainte-Laguë method. If a party wins fewer constituency seats in a state than its second votes would entitle it to, it receives additional seats from the relevant state list. Parties can file lists in each single state under certain conditions; for example, a fixed number of supporting signatures. Parties can receive second votes only in those states in which they have successfully filed a state list.

If a party by winning single-member constituencies in one state receives more seats than it would be entitled to according to its second vote share in that state (so-called overhang seats), the other parties receive compensation seats. Owing to this provision, the Bundestag usually has more than 598 members. The 18th Bundestag, for example, started with 631 seats: 598 regular and 33 overhang and compensation seats. Overhang seats are calculated at the state level, so many more seats are added to balance this out among the different states, adding more seats than would be needed to compensate for overhang at the national level in order to avoid negative vote weight.

In order to qualify for seats based on the party-list vote share, a party must either win three single-member constituencies or exceed a threshold of 5% of the second votes nationwide. If a party only wins one or two single-member constituencies and fails to get at least 5% of the second votes, it keeps the single-member seat(s), but other parties that accomplish at least one of the two threshold conditions receive compensation seats. (In the most recent example of this, during the 2002 election, the PDS won only 4.0% of the party-list votes nationwide, but won two constituencies in the state of Berlin.) The same applies if an independent candidate wins a single-member constituency (which has not happened since 1949). In the 2013 election, the FDP only won 4.8% of party-list votes; this cost it all of its seats in the Bundestag.

If a voter has cast a first vote for a successful independent candidate or a successful candidate whose party failed to qualify for proportional representation, their second vote does not count to determine proportional representation. However, it does count to determine whether the elected party has exceeded the 5% threshold.

Parties representing recognized national minorities (currently Danes, Frisians, Sorbs and Romani people) are exempt from the 5% threshold, but normally only run in state elections.

Nationwide

Leaders' races

By state

Summary

Schleswig-Holstein

Mecklenburg-Vorpommern

Hamburg

Lower Saxony

Bremen

Brandenburg

Saxony-Anhalt

Berlin

North Rhine-Westphalia

Saxony

Hesse

Thuringia

Rhineland-Palatinate

Bavaria

Baden-Württemberg

Saarland

Notes

References

2017 elections in Germany
2017